Informal Talks is a Chinese talk show co-produced by Bilibili and Hubei Television. Informal Talks airs on Hubei Television and Heilongjiang Television on Fridays at 21:20 beginning April 24, 2015.

Starting Season 1 Episode 5, every episode begins with a Culture Discussion, followed by debates related to the discussion topic, where representatives can share their opinions. The show discusses various topics and issues in Mandarin. The atmosphere is meant to emulate a meeting of world leaders, but the tone of the show can range from serious to emotional to humorous.

Series overview
In Season 1, there were 20 regular episodes, and 3 special episodes (Episode 17, 18, 23). In Season 2, there were 46 regular episodes and 3 special episodes that look back at certain moments on the show. Season 6 consisted of 8 episodes filmed in the studio in Beijing, and 16 episodes filmed remotely due to the COVID-19 Pandemic.

Hosts
The panel consists of a "President", a "Vice President", a “Secretary General", a "Clerk" and  "representatives" from different countries.

Current Hosts

Past Substitute Hosts

Representatives
In Season 1, there were 10 representatives of Informal Talks (known as IT10): Brian Gonzalez, Beijing International Studies University international business student; Arash Estilaf, actor and PhD Film Studies student; YOYO, model; Giuseppe Mighali, Suhrobjon Nazarov, Renmin University of China student; Alexandre Dubos, founder of French-Street (wine company); Nathaus Patrick, Audi executive; Kim Han-il (Jack), singer; Zack Ireland Splittgerber, actor and Mohammed Osama, Xinhua News Agency journalist. After Episode 4, Giuseppe Mighali left due to work related reasons and was replaced by Alec Odahara, marketing manager, in Episode 5. After Episode 15, Suhrobjon Nazarov left to serve in the Russian Army and was replaced by Vladislav Shergin in Episode 17. At the end of Season 1, Alexandre Dubos and Nathaus Patrick left due to work related reasons.

In Season 2, there were 11 representatives (IT11). Alistair Bayley, Monash University arts student; James Ifeanyi Ogbobe, tourism management student and kindergarten teacher; and Steven Oo, fashion designer joined the cast. At the end of Season 2, Steven Oo left due to work related reasons. Mohammed Osama, Zach Ireland Splittgerber, and Vladislav Shergin announced on Weibo that they were informed by the producers of Informal Talks they would not continue to be representatives in Season 3. Kim Han-il (Jack) left for unknown reasons.

In Season 3, Cedric Jun Jie Loo (guest representative in Season 2 Episode 13), actor and model; Mirco Tranchina, Beijing Normal University Linguistics student; Sasha, Harbin Engineering University international business student; Idris Kartav, Xiamen University International Relations and Affairs student and Dominic Romeo joined the cast. After Season 3, Mirco left due to immigration difficulties, and Alec and James left due to work. In Season 3.5, they were replaced with Dylan Jaye, an investment banker; Brian O'Shea and Patrick Köllmer.

Current Representatives

Past Representatives

Guest Representatives

Similar shows

South Korean show

Non-Summit is the original show. It is produced by Korean television company JTBC and features handsome Korean-speaking foreign men discussing a wide range of political and social issues.

In 2015, a Non-Summit spin-off aired called Where is My Friend's Home. The show features the cast of Non-Summit and was filmed across 12 different countries.

Turkish franchise

In 2014, atv purchased the rights for a Turkish adaptation of Non-Summit, titled Elİn Oğlu, which premiered on 21 March 2015.

Chinese franchises

In 2015, Jiangsu Television purchased the rights for a Chinese adaptation of Non-Summit, titled A Bright World (世界青年说), which premiered on 16 April 2015.

References

External links
 

2015 Chinese television series debuts
Chinese-language television shows
Chinese television talk shows
Non-Summit
Chinese television series based on South Korean television series